Sylvester Ryan may refer to:

Sylvester Donovan Ryan (b. 1930), retired Roman Catholic bishop
Sylvester J. Ryan (1896–1981), U.S. federal judge
Sylvester Perry Ryan (1918-2001), Canadian lawyer and politician